The Church of St Catherine of Alexandria, commonly known as the Church of St Catherine of Italy is a Roman Catholic church in Valletta, Malta. It was built by the Hospitaller Langue of Italy and it serves as the parish church of the Italian community of Malta.

Origins

The church was built in 1576 by the Italian knights of St John to serve as their church. It was built adjacent to the Auberge d'Italie. Girolamo Cassar was commissioned to draw up the plans. In the 17th century the church was enlarged. An octagonal church was added to the existing chapel. The original chapel was changed into the sanctuary of the church. The church underwent a major restoration from 2001 till 2011. Today the church still serves as the parish church of the Italian community of Malta.

The church building is listed on the National Inventory of the Cultural Property of the Maltese Islands.

Works of Art
The titular painting was painted by Mattia Preti. It depicts the martyrdom of St Catherine of Alexandria.  Preti donated the painting to the church after his arrival in Malta. The cupola of the church was also painted by Preti. He drew it with painted stucco decorations and ornamental patterns in grey and gold.

See also
https://chiesasantacaterinaditalia.org/
Culture of Malta
History of Malta
List of Churches in Malta
Religion in Malta

References

1576 establishments in Europe
Roman Catholic churches in Malta
Buildings and structures in Valletta
National Inventory of the Cultural Property of the Maltese Islands
Church buildings of the Knights Hospitaller
16th-century establishments in Malta
Baroque church buildings in Malta